Fernando Ferreyros (born 16 August 1960) is a Peruvian judoka. He competed in the men's heavyweight event at the 1984 Summer Olympics.

References

1960 births
Living people
Peruvian male judoka
Olympic judoka of Peru
Judoka at the 1984 Summer Olympics
Place of birth missing (living people)